Soumia Hady (born 30 June 1998) is a Moroccan footballer who plays as a defender for COD Meknès and the Morocco women's national team.

Club career
Hady has played for CODM in Morocco.

International career
Hady has capped for Morocco at under-20 and senior levels.

See also
List of Morocco women's international footballers

References

1998 births
Living people
Moroccan women's footballers
Women's association football defenders
Morocco women's international footballers